Stephen Penford Lock  (born 8 April 1929) is an English haematologist and editor who served as editor-in-chief of medical trade journal the BMJ from 1975 to 1991. A prominent scholar of the peer review process, he coined the term "journalology" to refer to the scientific study of the academic publishing process. In 1990, Eugene Garfield described him as "an elder statesman of biomedical editing".

Lock was educated at Queens' College, Cambridge, and St Bartholomew's Hospital Medical College, where he trained in haematology. He worked at St Bartholomew's Hospital, the Hospital for Sick Children, and other hospitals before joining the BMJ. He originally began working at the BMJ in 1964 as an assistant editor, and he was promoted to the positions of senior assistant editor and deputy editor before becoming editor-in-chief in 1975. 

In 1982, while editor of the BMJ, he introduced its Christmas edition, which contained many humorous articles, as well as interesting historical stories about medicine. This light-hearted edition has since become an annual tradition. He also changed the journal's peer review system by introducing a "hanging committee", consisting of two clinicians and two of the journal's official editors; the committee was responsible for choosing papers to publish in the BMJ from a pool of submissions recommended from outside reviewers. 

He was a co-founder of the Vancouver Group (later the International Committee of Medical Journal Editors), as well as a former president of the European Association of Science Editors.

References

Further reading

1929 births
Living people
Medical journal editors
British haematologists
Alumni of Queens' College, Cambridge
Alumni of the Medical College of St Bartholomew's Hospital
British editors